Ryan George Christopher Rae (born 21 August 1991) is a South African soccer player who last played as a midfielder for South African Premier Division side Maritzburg United.

Club career
In October 2020, he joined Chippa United on a three-year deal. He left Chippa United in February 2021 after 7 appearances for the club (league and cup) and subsequently signed for Maritzburg United.

References

External links
 Highlands Park bio

1991 births
Living people
Soccer players from Johannesburg
White South African people
South African soccer players
Association football midfielders
Highlands Park F.C. players
Chippa United F.C. players
Maritzburg United F.C. players
South African Premier Division players
National First Division players